In Greek mythology, Demonice is the name of two women.

Demonice, daughter of Agenor of Pleuron.
Demonice, a maiden of Ephesus. Brennus, king of the Gauls who was razing Asia Minor came to Ephesus and fell in love with Demonice. She promised to yield to him, and also to betray her country, if he would give her golden bracelets and the jewels of the Gaulish women. Brennus told his soldiers to throw into her lap the gold they were wearing, and she was buried alive.

Notes

References 

 Lucius Mestrius Plutarchus, Moralia with an English Translation by Frank Cole Babbitt. Cambridge, MA. Harvard University Press. London. William Heinemann Ltd. 1936. Online version at the Perseus Digital Library. Greek text available from the same website.
 Pseudo-Apollodorus, The Library with an English Translation by Sir James George Frazer, F.B.A., F.R.S. in 2 Volumes, Cambridge, MA, Harvard University Press; London, William Heinemann Ltd. 1921. . Online version at the Perseus Digital Library. Greek text available from the same website.

Women in Greek mythology
Characters in Greek mythology